The 1998 Pendle Borough Council election took place on 7 May 1998 to elect members of Pendle Borough Council in Lancashire, England. One third of the council was up for election and the Liberal Democrats stayed in overall control of the council.

After the election, the composition of the council was:
Liberal Democrat 29
Labour 18
Conservative 3
Independent 1

Campaign
17 seats were contested in the election, with the Liberal Democrats defending 10 seats, Labour 6 and the Conservatives 1 seat. The election saw controversy over proxy votes, as the Labour and Liberal Democrat parties accused each other of abusing the system.

During the campaign the Liberal Democrat national leader Paddy Ashdown came to Pendle to support his party.

Election result
The results saw no change in the political balance of the council, with the Liberal Democrats remaining in control of the council. The Labour Party gained 2 seats from the Liberal Democrats in Bradley and Waterside wards, but the Liberal Democrats took the seats of Walverden and Whitefield back. Meanwhile, the Conservative group leader, Roy Clarkson, held the only seat the Conservatives had been defending in Reedley. Overall turnout in the election was 34.4%.

Ward results

By-elections between 1998 and 1999

References

1998 English local elections
1998
1990s in Lancashire